Anna Strong may refer to:
 Anna Strong (spy) (1740–1812), part of Culper Spy Ring
 Anna Louise Strong (1885–1970), American journalist & activist